Kathryn Eileen Grimes (born January 8, 2006) is an American competitive swimmer. At the 2022 World Aquatics Championships, she won silver medals in the 1500 meter freestyle and the 400 meter individual medley. She placed fourth in the 800 meter freestyle at the 2020 Summer Olympics, where she was the youngest member of the US Olympic Team at 15 years of age.

Early life
Grimes spent her early childhood in Las Vegas, and began her career swimming for the Sandpipers competitive team in Nevada.

2020 Olympic Games

At the 2020 US Olympic Trials in Omaha, Nebraska, Grimes qualified for the 2020 Summer Olympics in the 800 meter freestyle, placing second after Katie Ledecky with a time of 8:20.36. Following the race, Ledecky commented that Grimes was the "future" of swimming in the United States, and also said to Grimes, "Heck yeah I mean you're the now. You're the present."

Ledecky gave Grimes the nickname of "Katie squared" after they became teammates. When she arrived in Tokyo, Japan, she was 15 years old and the youngest athlete on the 2020 US Olympic team. Grimes ranked second overall in the prelims heats of the 800 meter freestyle with a time of 8:17.05, which was less than a second and a half slower than first-ranked swimmer in the prelims heats, Katie Ledecky. In the final, Grimes placed fourth with a time of 8:19.38, finishing within six seconds of both silver medalist Ariarne Titmus of Australia and bronze medalist Simona Quadarella of Italy.

2021 World Short Course Championships
Grimes entered to compete in the 800 meter freestyle at the 2021 World Short Course Championships held at Etihad Arena in Abu Dhabi, United Arab Emirates in December. As part of the Abu Dhabi Aquatics Festival, also run by FINA and held at the same time as the championships, Grimes entered to compete in the 10 kilometer open water swim, where she placed 25th with a time of 2:01:04.0. The following day, December 17, Grimes swam a 8:16.01 in the prelims heats of the 800 meter freestyle at the championships, finishing fifth in her heat, ranking seventh overall and qualifying for the final the following day. December 18, Grimes officially withdrew from competition alongside teammate Lydia Jacoby and did not race in the final of the 800 meter freestyle due to COVID-19 pandemic-related protocols in place at the championships.

2022
On April 1, Grimes won the 10 kilometer marathon swim at the 2022 US Open Water National Championships. She also won the national junior title in the 7.5 kilometer open water swim.

2022 International Team Trials
At the 2022 US International Team Trials in Greensboro, North Carolina in late April, she placed fourth in the 800 meter freestyle with a time of 8:22.73. The following day, she ranked eighth in the prelims heats of the 200 meter freestyle, qualifying for the final with her time of 1:58.67. Later in the same session, she qualified for the final of the 200 meter backstroke with a time of 2:11.31 and overall eighth-rank. In the evening finals session, she placed eighth in the 200 meter freestyle with a 1:58.22 and did not swim in the final of the 200 meter backstroke. On day three, she ranked second in the prelims heats of the 400 meter individual medley with a time of 4:41.02, advancing to the evening final. She won the final with a time of 4:36.17, qualifying for the 2022 World Aquatics Championships team in the event. The next day, she ranked sixth in the preliminary heats of the 400 meter freestyle with a 4:11.39 and qualified for the evening final. She placed fourth in the final, finishing in 4:06.67. In the final of the 1500 meter freestyle on day five, she swam a 15:51.36, placing second and qualifying for the World Championships team in the event.

2022 Marathon Swim World Series
For the 10 kilometre marathon swim at the first leg of the 2022 Marathon Swim World Series, held at Albarquel in Setúbal, Portugal in late May, Grimes placed eighth overall, ranked eighth amongst female competitors in terms of points scored, and ranked as the highest-scoring female American competitor. Based on her result at the World Series, she was named to the USA Swimming roster for the 10 kilometre marathon swim in open water swimming at the 2022 World Aquatics Championships.

2022 World Aquatics Championships

Grimes started her competition at the 2022 World Aquatics Championships on the second day of pool swimming, advancing to the final of the 1500 meter freestyle from the preliminaries, where she swam a 15:57.05 to enter the final with a prelims time over half a second faster than fourth-ranked Lani Pallister of Australia. She swam a personal best time of 15:44.89 in the final to win the silver medal, finishing over four full seconds ahead of bronze medalist Lani Pallister. On the final day of pool swimming competition, she ranked second in the prelims of the 400 meter individual medley, qualifying for the final with a time of 4:36.68. In the final, she won the silver medal with a personal best time of 4:32.67. Following pool swimming competition, she competed in the 10 kilometer open water swim, placing fifth with a time of 2:02:37.2, which was less than 10 seconds behind gold medalist Sharon van Rouwendaal of the Netherlands.

FINA World Cup 
On the second day Indianapolis leg of the 2022 FINA Swimming World Cup, Grimes swam the short course 1500m freestyle, earning the World Junior Record in the process.

Personal best times

Long course meters (50 m pool)

Legend: h – prelims heat

Awards
 SwimSwam, Top 100 (Women's): 2022 (#39)

References

External links
 
 

2006 births
Living people
Sportspeople from Las Vegas
American female freestyle swimmers
Swimmers at the 2020 Summer Olympics
Olympic swimmers of the United States
21st-century American women
World Aquatics Championships medalists in swimming